The Order of San Carlos is a state order granted by Colombia.  The order was founded 16 August 1954 to honor Colombian citizens and foreign civilians and military officers who have made outstanding contributions to the nation of Colombia, especially in the field of international relations.

Grades
 Collar (Collar)
 Grand Cross with Gold Badge (Gran Cruz con Placa de Oro)
 Grand Cross (Gran Cruz)
 Grand Officer (Gran Oficial)
 Commander (Comendador)
 Officer (Oficial)
 Knight (Caballero)

Notable recipients
 Jean-Michel Blanquer
 Queen Juliana of the Netherlands
 Eusebio Leal Spengler
 Klaus Müller-Leiendecker
 Smurfit Kappa
 Gustavo Vasco Muñoz
 Engin Yürür
 Agustín Díaz de Mera
 Yu Takeuchi
 Cristián Samper
 Condoleezza Rice
 United States Southern Command

References

External links
 World Awards

Orders, decorations, and medals of Colombia